2019–20 Belarusian Cup was the twenty-ninth season of the Belarusian annual cup competition. Contrary to the league season, it is conducted in a fall-spring rhythm. It started in 22 May 2019 and will conclude with a final match in May 2020. Winners of the Cup will qualify for the second qualifying round of the 2020–21 UEFA Europa League.

Participating clubs 
The following teams take part in the competition:

First round
In this round 6 amateur clubs were drawn against 6 Second League clubs. The draw was performed on 3 May 2019. The matches were played on 22 May 2019.

Second round
In this round 6 winners of the First Round were joined by another 22 clubs. The draw was performed on 23 May 2019. The matches were played on 12 June 2019.

Round of 32
In this round 14 winners of the Second Round were joined by another 18 clubs. The draw was performed on 13 June 2019. The matches were played on 24–28 July 2019. Four matches involving European Cups participants were played earlier, on 26 June 2019.

Round of 16
The draw was performed on 29 July 2019. The matches will be played on 3 and 4 August 2019.

Quarter-finals

|}

First leg

Second leg

Semi-finals

|}

First leg

Second leg

Final
The final was played on 24 May 2020 at Dinamo Stadium in Minsk.

References

External links
 Football.by

2019–20 European domestic association football cups
Cup
Cup
2019–20